Hypsopygia placens is a species of snout moth in the genus Hypsopygia. It is found in Japan, Korea, China and Russia.

The wingspan is 23–26 mm. Adults are on wing from July to August.

References

Moths described in 1879
Pyralini
Moths of Japan